Turka (Turuka) or Curama (Cuuramã, Tchourama, Tyurama), is a Gur language which is spoken by the Turka people in southwest Burkina Faso. Its closest linguistic relative is the Cerma language: however, they are not mutually intelligible. Due to economic, religious and educational influence, many Turka people also speak Arabic and Jula.

Writing system

Nasalization is indicated with a tilde on the vowel : .

The tones are indicated using diacritics on the vowels or the syllabic nasals, with the acute accent for the high tone and the grave accent for the low tone.

References

Gur languages
Languages of Burkina Faso